The BitGive Foundation is an American nonprofit organization that solicits bitcoin donations for use in charitable causes.

Background
BitGive was established by Connie Gallippi in 2013. The organization was the first Bitcoin and Blockchain technology nonprofit. The organization has received 501(c)(3) tax exempt status from the United States Internal Revenue Service.

BitGive was founded with the goal of strengthening philanthropic impact globally by using cryptocurrency to make the process faster and more secure. On GiveTrack, nonprofits can post projects and donors can contribute funds. Contributions can be made in bitcoin or in dollars. The platform also gives donors financial reporting and project results in real time.

In 2017–2018, BitGive received $1 million from the Pineapple Fund, a philanthropic endeavor by an anonymous donor known only as “Pine,” who sought to donate “the majority of [their] bitcoins to charitable causes.”

Partnerships
BitGive has worked with numerous nonprofits globally, including Save the Children, and The Water Project.

Leadership 
Connie Gallippi is one of the first female founders in the cryptocurrency space. In recognition of her work, Gallippi has been recognized on several lists of notable women in cryptocurrency from various publications, including Glamour, HuffPost, and the FinTech Times, among others. She currently serves on the board of directors for the Sierra Business Council. Gallippi holds a BS in Natural Resource Management from Virginia Tech.

BitGive's board of directors is composed of notable figures from the blockchain and cryptocurrency space: Rumi Morales (Board President), Sandra Ro (Board Treasurer), Matthew Roszak, Dawn Newton, Paul Lamb, and Justin Steffen. Emeritus board members include: Patrick Murck, Stephen Pair, and Alyse Killeen.

References

External links
 

Bitcoin organizations
Charities based in California
Foundations based in the United States
Organizations established in 2013
2013 establishments in the United States